Latin percussion is a family of percussion, membranophone, lamellophone and idiophone instruments used in Latin music.

Instruments

Afro-Cuban and Puerto Rican styles

Folkloric and Santeria
Trap drums
Abakua and Arará drums
Chekere/Shekere
Erikundi
Bata
Cowbell
Shaker
Conga
Cajon
Guiro
Barril de bomba
Pandereta plenera
Cuá
mouth sounds

20-21st century music (Salsa, Son Montuno, Bolero, etc.)
Bongo
Conga
Clave/Wood block
Cowbell (cencerro)
Timbales
Shaker/Maraca
Güiro
Cajón

South America
Timbales, a similar Afro-Cuban instrument
Surdo
Cuíca
Caixa
Reco-reco
Cabasa/Afuche
Repinique
Agogô
Tan-tan
Pandeiro
Tamborim
Apito
Berimbau

Neo Samba and Neo-Bossa Nova additions

Conga
Timbales
Bongo
Clave/Wood block
Cowbell

Andean styles (Peru, Bolivia, South Ecuador, Argentina, Chile)
Rain Stick
Reco-reco
Sheep hooves, or chapchas
Chipaya box
Bombo
Huancara
Maraca

Coastal Peruvian and Afro-Peruvian
Cajon
Spoons
Cajita

Afro-Dominican

Folkloric
Various African drums
Shaker
Tambora
Palo drums
Marimbula

Merengue and Bacha-rengue
Tambora
Güira
Timbales
Conga
Bass drum (played by Güirero)

Bachata
Güira
Bongo
Conga

Other Caribbean

Honduran Punta & Folkloric music
Shaker/Rattle
Garawon (drum)
Turtle Shells
La Marimba

Guatemalan & Salvadoran folklore
Marimba
Shaker
Rattle
Guiro
Bass drum

Cumbia (Colombia, Mexico, El Salvador, etc.)
Conga
Güira and Guiro
Maracas
Timbales
Wood block
Tambora
Cowbell
Bongos

Haitian
Tanbou rada
Tanbou Petwo

Trinidad
dholak
steel drum
conga

Go-Go
Conga
Timbales
Cowbell
Wood block
Bongo drum

External links
Percussion Info.- Latin Percussion and World Drumming Resource.
Percussion Instruments